Barbara Noack (28 September 1924 – 20 December 2022) was a German writer.

Publications 
 Valentine heißt man nicht!, Darmstadt 1954
 Die Zürcher Verlobung, Berlin 1955
 Italienreise – Liebe inbegriffen, Berlin 1957
 Oh diese Babys, Frankfurt am Main 1960 (zusammen mit Bernd Lohse und Eugen Saska-Weiß)
 Ein gewisser Herr Ypsilon, Berlin 1961
 Geliebtes Scheusal, Berlin 1963
 Danziger Liebesgeschichte, Berlin 1964
 Was halten Sie vom Mondschein?, Berlin 1966
 … und flogen achtkantig aus dem Paradies, Berlin 1969
 Eines Knaben Phantasie hat meistens schwarze Knie, Berlin 1971
 Der Bastian, München 1974 (nach dem Drehbuch 1973)
 Ferien sind schöner, München 1974
 Kann ich noch ein bißchen bleiben?, Berlin 1975
 Liebesgeschichten, München 1975
 Das kommt davon, wenn man verreist, München 1977
 Auf einmal sind sie keine Kinder mehr oder Die Zeit am See, München 1978
 Flöhe hüten ist leichter. Illustrationen: Peter Schimmel, München 1980
 Kleine Diplomaten, Freiburg im Breisgau 1981
 Drei sind einer zuviel, München 1982
 Eine Handvoll Glück, München 1982
 Ferienzeit, München 1983
 Ich wünsche dir …, München 1983
 So muß es wohl im Paradies gewesen sein, München 1984
 Ein Stück vom Leben, München 1984
 Ein Platz an der Sonne, München 1985
 Der Zwillingsbruder, München 1988
 Brombeerzeit, München 1992
 Glück und was sonst noch zählt, München 1993
 Jennys Geschichte, München 1999
 Die schönsten Geschichten, München 2001
 Die schönsten Kindergeschichten, München 2009

References

External links

1924 births
2022 deaths
German women writers
Writers from Berlin